David Rhodes, stagename Rhodes (stylised RHODES, born 1988), is an English singer and songwriter from Baldock, Hertfordshire, England. He released his debut EP Raise Your Love on Hometown Records in October 2013 and released his second EP Morning on Rhodes Music on 12 May 2014. His debut album Wishes was released on 18 September 2015.

Music career

2013: Early career and Raise Your Love EP
Rhodes's music began to spread early 2013 when his demo track "Always" was playlisted on Amazing Radio and then picked up plays from BBC Radio 1. Following a period supporting Rufus Wainwright, Laura Marling and Nick Mulvey in the UK, his debut EP Raise Your Love was released on Phil Taggart's label Hometown Records in October 2013.

2014: Morning EP and live performances
On 12 March 2014, Rhodes released the song "Your Soul" – which was premiered by Zane Lowe on BBC Radio 1 as his 'Next Hype' – taken from his second EP 'Morning' released on 11 May 2014.
On this EP, Rhodes recorded alongside Ian Grimble and Tim Bran/Roy Kerr, producers who have been previously working with the likes of London Grammar and Daughter.

In March and April 2014, Rhodes completed his first UK headline tour, including 3 sold out gigs at London's Sebright Arms on 8, 9 & 10 April 2014. He supported London Grammar on their UK tour (including one of the O2 Academy Brixton Academy shows) as well as Sam Smith in the UK (at the Roundhouse) and in Europe (Amsterdam and Paris).
Rhodes also performed at BBC Radio 1 Big Weekend in Glasgow on the BBC Introducing stage on 25 May and at the Glastonbury Festival on 29 June on the Rabbit Hole stage.

2015–present: Wishes 
On 26 June 2015, he played at the Park Stage at Glastonbury Festival. In July, the first single to be taken from his album Wishes , "Close your Eyes", charted at 85 on the UK Singles Chart. A week before the release of his debut album, Rhodes released a duet with Birdy, "Let It All Go". It charted in many countries and is his most successful single to date. He then released Wishes, which peaked at 24 on the UK Albums Chart.

Rhodes featured on Kygo's debut studio album Cloud Nine, providing the vocals for the track "Not Alone".

On 9 June 2017, he released the single, "Sleep Is a Rose", and the music video for the song, which was recorded live, was released the same day on the Rhodes Vevo channel on YouTube. The song came to him one sleepless night in the Lake District. He was lying awake in a small cottage when he came up with the song. On 23 March he released a collaboration with German DJ Alle Farben of a cover of American country music duo Florida Georgia Line's song "H.O.L.Y.".

Discography

Albums

Extended plays

Singles

References

External links
 
  on Last.FM

1988 births
Living people
English male singer-songwriters
21st-century English singers
Ministry of Sound artists
21st-century British male singers